Sarani (also Romanized as Sārānī) is a village in Dust Mohammad Rural District, in the Central District of Hirmand County, Sistan and Baluchestan Province, Iran. At the 2006 census, its population was 392, in 84 families.

References 

Populated places in Hirmand County